Mielec Euro-Park Special Economic Zone is the oldest SEZ in Poland. It was founded in 1995 in Mielec.

As of April 2012, SEZ Euro-Park Mielec spreads on the total area or 1246 ha in the following locations:
 Mielec – 605 ha 
 Rzeszów (including neighboring Głogów Małopolski and Trzebownisko) – 170 ha 
 Lublin – 118 ha
 Szczecin – 73 ha
 Zamość – 54 ha 
 Krosno – 36 ha
 Leżajsk – 27 ha 
 Dębica – 35 ha 
 Gorlice – 21 ha 
 Lubartów – 20 ha
 Jarosław – 14 ha 
 Ropczyce and Gmina Ostrów – 45 ha 
 Sanok – 15 ha 
 Lubaczów – 9 ha 
 Kolbuszowa – 8 ha 
 Radzyń Podlaski – 2 ha

References

External links 
 Official website

Mielec
Special economic zones